Ivan Lanni (born 30 June 1990) is an Italian footballer who plays as a goalkeeper for  club Siena.

Career 
On 30 January 2020, he signed a 1.5-year contract with Novara.

Career statistics

Club

Honours

Club 
Ascoli
 Lega Pro: 2014–15

References

1990 births
Living people
People from Alatri
Footballers from Lazio
Italian footballers
Association football goalkeepers
Serie B players
Serie C players
Serie D players
A.S. Roma players
U.S. Lecce players
F.C. Grosseto S.S.D. players
Pisa S.C. players
Ascoli Calcio 1898 F.C. players
Novara F.C. players
A.C.N. Siena 1904 players
Sportspeople from the Province of Frosinone